John Robert "Tony" Harris (18 October 1922 – 25 August 2000) was a Scottish professional footballer who played for Queen's Park, Aberdeen and Airdrieonians.

Football career
Harris began his career with amateur club Queen's Park during the Second World War. He had briefly served in the RAF and Royal Navy during the War, but was sent back to university when it was discovered that he was a dental student, dentists being in short supply during the War. He also played for Scotland in one wartime international.

In 1946, Harris joined Aberdeen and was part of the team that won the club's first major honour, the 1947 Scottish Cup. He also played in the 1953 Scottish Cup Final for Aberdeen, but they were defeated by Rangers.

After leaving Aberdeen, Harris signed for Airdrieonians and played there for two seasons before retiring in 1956.

After football
In 1969, Harris was part of a consortium attempting to take over Aberdeen F.C., along with fellow ex-Aberdeen player Don Emery. The takeover bid was ultimately unsuccessful.

He died in August 2000, aged 77.

Career statistics

Club

Appearances and goals by club, season and competition

Honours
Aberdeen
Scottish Cup: 1947

References

1922 births
2000 deaths
Association football outside forwards
Association football wing halves
Scottish footballers
Footballers from Glasgow
Queen's Park F.C. players
Aberdeen F.C. players
Airdrieonians F.C. (1878) players
Scottish Football League players
Scotland wartime international footballers
People from Maryhill
Alumni of the University of Glasgow
Scottish dentists
Royal Air Force personnel of World War II
Royal Navy personnel of World War II
20th-century dentists